Vashti Bunyan (born Jennifer Vashti Bunyan, 1945) is an English singer-songwriter. Beginning her career in the mid-1960s, she released her debut album, Just Another Diamond Day, in 1970. The album sold very few copies and Bunyan, discouraged, abandoned her musical career. By 2000, her album had acquired a cult following; it was re-released and Bunyan recorded more songs, initiating the second phase of her musical career after a gap of thirty years. She subsequently released two more albums: Lookaftering in 2005, and Heartleap in 2014.

Early life and education
Bunyan was born in South Tyneside in 1945 to John Bunyan and Helen Webber, the youngest of three children.  She was told that she was named after a boat that belonged to her father, a name that was also a nickname for her mother inspired by queen Vashti. The family moved to London when she was six months old. Although she has been said to be descended from The Pilgrim's Progress author John Bunyan, this is a claim she has herself denied. In the early 1960s, she studied at the Ruskin School of Drawing and Fine Art at Oxford University, but was expelled for focusing on music instead of art.

Musical career

1960s
At age 18, Bunyan travelled to New York and discovered the music of Bob Dylan through his The Freewheelin' Bob Dylan album and decided to become a full-time musician. Returning to London, she was introduced to The Rolling Stones' manager Andrew Loog Oldham by an agent. In June 1965, under his direction, she released her first single, "Some Things Just Stick in Your Mind", penned by Mick Jagger and Keith Richards. Released using simply the name Vashti, it was backed with her own song "I Want to Be Alone". This single and her follow-up "Train Song", released on Columbia in May 1966, produced by Canadian Peter Snell, received little attention.

Also at this time, her distinctive vocal appeared on "The Coldest Night of the Year" by Twice as Much, eventually included on their second and final LP, That's All, released by Oldham's Immediate Records in 1968. After recording additional (and unreleased) songs for Immediate Records, and making a brief appearance in the 1967 documentary Tonite Let's All Make Love in London with her song "Winter Is Blue", she decided to travel with her then-boyfriend Robert Lewis by horse and cart to the Hebrides to join a commune planned by a friend, fellow singer-songwriter Donovan ("...from South London up to the Hebrides. Initially to Skye but we carried on to the Outer Hebrides."). During the trip she began writing the songs that would eventually appear on her first album, Just Another Diamond Day.

At Christmas 1968, during a break from her trip, she met producer Joe Boyd through a friend and he offered to record an album of her travelling songs for his Witchseason Productions. A year later, Bunyan returned to London and recorded her first LP with assistance from Simon Nicol and Dave Swarbrick of Fairport Convention, Robin Williamson of The Incredible String Band and string arranger Robert Kirby. The album appeared on Philips Records to warm reviews in December 1970, but struggled to find an audience.

Disappointed, she left the music industry and moved to The Incredible String Band's Glen Row cottages, then Ireland, and back to Scotland. Much of the ensuing 30 years were spent raising her three children. In this time, entirely unknown to her, the original album slowly became one of the most sought-after records of its time. It has sold online on Discogs for as much as US$3,946.

2000 to present
In 2000, Just Another Diamond Day was re-released on CD (with bonus tracks), which exposed Bunyan's music to a new generation of folk artists such as Devendra Banhart and Joanna Newsom. In 2001, Banhart wrote to her asking for her advice, beginning her connection with many of the contemporary performers who cite her work. In 2002, she was invited by Piano Magic musician Glen Johnson to sing guest vocals on his song "Crown of the Lost", her first recording in over 30 years. Since then, she has appeared on releases by Devendra Banhart and Animal Collective.

In 2005, she recorded and released her second album, Lookaftering on Fat Cat Records, some 35 years after her first. The album was produced by composer Max Richter and featured many of her contemporary followers including Banhart, Joanna Newsom, Adem, Kevin Barker of Currituck Co, Otto Hauser of Espers and Adam Pierce of Mice Parade. It was well received by critics and fans alike.

During the autumn of 2006, Bunyan assembled an ad hoc band and embarked on a brief North American tour, with performances in both Canada and the US. She performed songs from both of her solo albums, as well as some of the rare material from the unreleased Oldham sessions.

Her music reached a much wider audience when "Just Another Diamond Day" was covered and used in a TV advert for T-Mobile. "Train Song" gained her further attention when it was used in 2008 by Reebok for an ad for the NFL, in 2014 as part of the soundtrack for the TV series True Detective, as well as in 2015 as the opening credits song for the Amazon Original Series Patriot.

In 2007, she collaborated with novelist Rodge Glass on the song "The Fire" for the compilation album Ballads of the Book which was devised to combine Scottish writers with Scottish singers (Bunyan lives in Edinburgh).
Bunyan also provided vocals on three songs for former Jack frontman Anthony Reynolds' debut solo album British Ballads.  Bunyan sang with Reynolds on the songs "Country Girl", "Just So You Know" and "Song of Leaving".
In October 2007 a compilation album of her mid-1960s singles and unreleased demos was released entitled Some Things Just Stick in Your Mind - Singles and Demos 1964 to 1967.

In January 2008, Bunyan said she was in the process of recording a new album: "I'm supposed to be writing just now. I have one complete song and a whole lot of fragments. I'm supposed to have them finished by May and there's no way."

In June 2008, she appeared at London's Royal Festival Hall with The Heritage Orchestra as part of Massive Attack's Meltdown, in a live performance of Vangelis' Blade Runner soundtrack, singing "Rachel's Song" as sung by Mary Hopkin on the original recorded soundtrack.

In October 2008, a feature documentary about her, Vashti Bunyan: From Here To Before, directed by Kieran Evans, had its world premieres at the Times BFI London Film Festival. It retraces Bunyan's journey across the U.K. and Ireland and sets it against the backdrop of her first high-profile London concert. It uses her trip through the U.K. and Ireland as its main narrative structure. The album provides the soundtrack to that journey, just as it did the first time.

In 2011, Bunyan's cover of the late John Martyn's "Head and Heart" appeared on the tribute album, Johnny Boy Would Love This...A Tribute to John Martyn.

In June 2014, she announced her third and final album, Heartleap. She wrote, "The whole point of the album was finally to learn a way that would enable me to record the music that is in my head, by myself. I neither read nor write music, nor can I play piano with more than one hand at a time, but I have loved being able to work it all out for myself and make it sound the way I wanted. I've built these songs over years. The album wouldn't have happened any other way." Heartleap was released on 7 October in the U.S. via DiCristina and 6 October in the UK via FatCat Records. The cover artwork was by Bunyan's daughter, Whyn Lewis, who also did the artwork for Lookaftering.

In 2022 she published a memoir Wayward: Just Another Life to Live (White Rabbit Books).

Reception
In 2008, Bunyan was labelled "the Godmother of Freak Folk" for her role in inspiring the "new generation of folk experimentalists including Devendra Banhart and Adem". Her music has also been categorized as folk, psychedelic folk, or new folk.

Despite these classifications, she has stated multiple times she is not a folk singer: "[...] I find it quite hard to read myself described as a folk singer, because I'm not." Her former producer Joe Boyd also underlines this in the 2008 Kieran Evans' film From Here to Before, explaining how he never considered Bunyan to be "[...] much of a folkie".

Discography

Studio albums
Just Another Diamond Day (Philips, 1970)
Lookaftering (Fat Cat Records, 2005)
Heartleap  (Fat Cat Records, 2014)

Compilations
Some Things Just Stick in Your Mind – Singles and Demos 1964 to 1967 (Fat Cat Records/Spinney Records, 2007)

Singles
"Some Things Just Stick in Your Mind" / "I Want to Be Alone" (Decca, 1965) (as Vashti)
"Train Song" / "Love Song" (Columbia, 1966) (as Vashti)

Compilation appearances
Tonite Lets All Make Love in London (1967)
"Winter Is Blue" (as Vashti)
"Winter Is Blue (Reprise)" (as Vashti)
Circus Days – UK Psychedelic Obscurities 1966–70 Vol.1 (1990)
"I'd Like to Walk Around in Your Mind" (as Vashti)
A Pot by Any Other Name (2001) (compilation issued by Ptolemaic Terrascope magazine)
"17 Pink Sugar Elephants" (rec. 1966) (early variation of "Train Song")
Instant Karma (2002)
"Winter Is Blue" (as Vashti) (combined version of song from Tonite Lets All Make Love in London)
Folk Rock and Faithfull: Dream Babes Vol. 5 (2004)
"Train Song" (rec. 1966) (as Vashti)
"Love Song" (rec. 1966) (as Vashti)
The Golden Apples of the Sun (2004)
"Rejoicing in the Hands" (with Devendra Banhart)
The Enlightened Family: A Collection Of Lost Songs (2005)
"Song of a Wishwanderer" (rec. 1968)
Not Alone (2006)
"Same But Different"
Ballads of the Book (2007)
"The Fire" (lyrics by Rodge Glass)
Gather in the Mushrooms – The British Acid-Folk Underground 1968 – 1974 (2004)
"Winter Is Blue"
Johnny Boy Would Love This...A Tribute to John Martyn (2011)
"Head and Heart"
Way to Blue: The Songs of Nick Drake (2013)
"Which Will"

Guest appearances
Twice as Much – That's All (1970)
"Coldest Night of the Year" (rec. 1967)
Piano Magic – Writers Without Homes (2002)
"Crown of the Lost"
Piano Magic – Saint Marie EP (2004)
"Dark Ages"
Devendra Banhart – Rejoicing in the Hands (2004)
"Rejoicing in the Hands"
Animal Collective – Prospect Hummer (2005)
"It's You"
"Prospect Hummer"
"I Remember Learning How to Dive"
Vetiver – Thing of the Past (2008)
"Sleep a Million Years"
Dudley Benson – Forest: Songs by Hirini Melbourne (2010)
"Tui"
We/Or/Me – The Walking Hour (2013)
"Time"
Devendra Banhart - Ma (2019)
"Will I See You Tonight?"
The Avalanches - We Will Always Love You (2020)
"Reflecting Light"

In popular culture

Bunyan's voice was heard on Saint Etienne Presents Finisterre (2005), a documentary about London featuring the music of the band Saint Etienne.
Friend, fellow folk singer and longtime fan Devendra Banhart reportedly writes her name on his arm before some concerts.
Lush covered her song "I'd Like To Walk Around in Your Mind".  They got to know it from the Circus Days compilation.
A cover of "Train Song" performed by Ben Gibbard and Feist appeared on Dark Was The Night, a charity compilation benefiting HIV/AIDS awareness and the Red Hot Organization. It was released by 4AD on 17 February 2009.
 "Diamond Day" was featured in the popular UK teen comedy/drama Skins on the third series (2009), episode six entitled "Naomi".
 Her song "Here Before" was covered by the Swedish artist Fever Ray, released as the B-side of the 2009 single "Stranger Than Kindness".
 "Here Before" also featured in the soundtrack for the 2008 BBC production Heist, about a medieval burglary.
 She is name-checked in the Half Man Half Biscuit song "Totnes Bickering Fair", from the 2008 album CSI:Ambleside.
 Bunyan's important link to the back-to-the-land counterculture of the 1970s and the insightful expressions of 'nature' in her work have been discussed in an academic paper in 2009 by geographer Keith Halfacree ('"Glow worms show the path we have to tread": the counterurbanisation of Vashti Bunyan', Social and Cultural Geography 10: 771–789).
 "Train Song" was selected as the background music for Samsung's 2011 SMART TV commercial.
 "Train Song" was also featured in the 2014 HBO television show True Detective.
 "Train Song" was used in the ad for Reebok 'Join The Migration' in 2014
 "Train Song" was used in the opening credits of the 2017 Amazon Original Series Patriot.
”Diamond Day” was featured in the Australian film Babyteeth in 2019.
 "I'd Like to Walk Around in Your Mind" is featured at the beginning of the 2017 Turkish film "Kedi".

References

External links
anotherday.co.uk Official website

1945 births
Living people
English folk musicians
English women guitarists
English guitarists
English women singer-songwriters
English folk singers
Musicians from Newcastle upon Tyne
Musicians from London
Singers from London
Freak folk
Psychedelic folk musicians
Animal Collective
Alumni of the Ruskin School of Art
FatCat Records artists
Columbia Records artists